Car Australia was an Australian automotive magazine published monthly until 1994.

History and profile
The magazine was first published in April 1946. Prior to March 1986, the magazine was known as Motor Manual.

References

1946 establishments in Australia
1994 disestablishments in Australia
Automobile magazines published in Australia
Monthly magazines published in Australia
Defunct magazines published in Australia
Magazines established in 1946
Magazines disestablished in 1994